PGM College, Kangazha, founded in 2005, is a private sector, self-financed educational institution in the village of Kangazha, in Kottayam District, in the state of Kerala, India.

Institution
The college was a dream of the former managing trustee of the Manohar Hill Charitable Trust, Sree. P Geevarghese, fulfilled by his son, the present managing trustee, and named after him.

The college is affiliated with M G University Kottayam and recognized by Kerala Government. It was started 2005, offering graduate courses in BSc Microbiology,  B.Com Computer Application, B.Com Finance & Taxation, BCA, BBA, M.Com and MSc Microbiology.

Admission

Admission to the college is based on merit. For undergraduate courses, plus two or equivalent with physics, chemistry and biology is required. For postgraduate courses respective graduation is required.

References

External links

Arts and Science colleges in Kerala
Colleges affiliated to Mahatma Gandhi University, Kerala
Universities and colleges in Kottayam district
Educational institutions established in 2005
2005 establishments in Kerala